Campaea margaritata, commonly known in the UK as the light emerald, is a moth of the family Geometridae. The species was first described by Carl Linnaeus in his 1767 12th edition of Systema Naturae. It is widely distributed throughout Europe, the Near East and North Africa. The habitat is mixed forests including parks and large gardens.

Description
Newly emerged adults have delicately pale green wings marked with green and white fascia, two on the slightly crenulate forewing, one on the hindwing. As with most moths of this colour, the green colouration is fugitive fading over time and older specimens tend to be almost pure white. The wingspan is 42–54 mm, the female generally being considerably larger than the male. The egg is smooth, long oval, but laid with the micropyle at the top; light grey, dark-dotted, later pink with the dots deep red. The larva is grey, brown or brownish-green, commonly with whitish dots, the segment-incisions well marked.

Life cycle
One or two broods are produced each year and adults can be seen at any time between July and September . The larva feeds on a variety of deciduous trees, including apple, beech, birch, elm, hawthorn, hazel and oak as well as several species of Prunus. The species overwinters as a larva, feeding on the soft bark of its food plants during the winter.

This moth flies at night and is attracted to light.
The flight season refers to the British Isles. This may vary in other parts of the range.

References

Chinery, Michael. Collins Guide to the Insects of Britain and Western Europe 1986 (Reprinted 1991)
Skinner, Bernard. Colour Identification Guide to Moths of the British Isles 1984

External links

Light emerald (Campaea margaritaria) at UKMoths

Campaea margaritaria at Fauna Europaea
Campaea margaritaria at Moths and Butterflies of Europe and North Africa
"07836 Campaea margaritaria (Linnaeus, [1760]) - Perlglanzspanner". Lepiforum e.V. Retrieved March 26, 2019.

Campaeini
Moths described in 1767
Moths of Africa
Moths of Europe
Moths of the Middle East
Moths of Asia
Taxa named by Carl Linnaeus